The Toyota bZ4X is a battery electric compact crossover SUV manufactured by Toyota. The vehicle debuted in April 2021 as the "bZ4X Concept". It is the first vehicle to be based on the e-TNGA platform co-developed by Toyota and Subaru, and the brand's first model to be part of their Toyota bZ ("beyond Zero") series of zero-emissions vehicles.

Worldwide sales of the bZ4X commenced in mid-2022, with production planned in Japan and China. Sales in the United States will also start in 2022. Toyota has also stated that there will be seven "bZ" models to be launched globally by 2025.

Name 
According to Toyota, the meaning of the "bZ4X" nameplate breaks down into:
 "bZ": for "beyond Zero" emissions, representing the nature of a battery-electric vehicle by going "beyond Zero" emissions,
 "4": from the equivalent-sized Toyota RAV4 and the
 "X": describing it as a compact crossover ('X') SUV.

Overview 
The design of the bZ4X was previewed by pictures of a series of electric concept vehicles released by Toyota in June 2019. The company highlighted the plan to release six electric vehicles between 2020 and 2025, using the e-TNGA platform. The vehicle was also previewed by Subaru, which is developing the vehicle with Toyota as a concept mockup showcasing a similar concept design in January 2020.

The bZ4X Concept was revealed in 19 April 2021 and was presented at Auto Shanghai on the same day. While it is revealed as a concept vehicle, the vehicle appeared to be nearly production-ready. The bZ4X is similar in size to the RAV4, but stood lower with sharper styling and a longer wheelbase that matches the larger Highlander's. The vehicle has been developed in conjunction with Subaru, which is said to have had input into the car’s all-wheel drive system.

Design 
The e-TNGA platform was jointly developed by Toyota and Subaru, with Toyota receiving credit for battery and eAxle development and Subaru for all-wheel-drive control and collision safety.

Some models also adopt a steer-by-wire system. The steer-by-wire system was developed for the Chinese market and will be available with a yoke in lieu of a conventional steering wheel. Combined with the low instrument panel, Toyota stated the yoke provides a more open interior.

Powertrains 

The bZ4X is powered by the e-Axle, which integrates an electric motor, gears and inverter, and is built by BluE Nexus, a joint venture of Toyota Group companies Aisin and Denso with investment from Toyota Motor.

On AWD models, the 'X-MODE' AWD-system from Subaru is "borrowed" from the Subaru Forester.

Front-wheel drive models have a  battery built by Prime Planet Energy & Solutions (PPES), a joint venture between Toyota and Panasonic. All-wheel drive models for the North American market have a  battery built by CATL. Both models are a 355 volt pack that accepts DC fast charging at a maximum rate of 150 kW for front-wheel drive models or 100 kW for all-wheel drive models. The battery is estimated to retain 90% of its original capacity over a ten-year period. The car can act as a power supply in V2H or V2L fashion.

Markets

Japan 
The Japanese market-spec bZ4X was announced in April 2022 and launched on 12 May 2022. The model is only available for lease through the company's Kinto service to "eliminate customer concerns" regarding battery electric vehicle while "taking the environment into consideration".

In the first phase, up to 3,000 lease applications will be accepted starting from 12 May; a second phase will follow in fall 2022, and Toyota/Kinto plan to lease up to 5,000 vehicles per year thereafter.

The bZ4X is available in one grade, Z, with front-wheel drive and all-wheel drive options. Specific packages include a choice of roof (standard or panoramic moon roof) and wheel size (18- or 20-inch diameter). The car is available with one of two interior colours and one of eleven exterior colours.

North America 
The North American market-spec bZ4X was unveiled at the 2021 Los Angeles Auto Show, with its specifications also detailed by that time, including its on-sale date set in mid-2022, for the 2023 model year.

At launch, American buyers qualify for the full  federal tax subsidy for purchasing an electric vehicle; each automobile manufacturer may sell up to 200,000 cars that qualify for the tax credit. Because Toyota plug-in hybrid vehicles also qualify for the tax credit, the credits are anticipated to be exhausted shortly after the launch of the bZ4X. The bZ4X is not eligible for electric vehicle incentives from the Inflation Reduction Act because it's not made in the US.

Europe 
Under the WLTP driving cycle, the front-wheel drive bZ4X achieves a range of  (14.3 kWh/100 km consumption) and the all-wheel drive bZ4X  (15.8 kWh/100 km). Deliveries of the first vehicles are expected to commence in summer 2022.

Southeast Asia 
The bZ4X was first announced in Singapore by Borneo Motors (Toyota's authorised retailer in Singapore) in June 2022 as part of an electric car-sharing program in the country's Tengah New Town. Although the car-sharing program would be rolled out in June 2023, the car has not been made available for sale in the country.

The bZ4X was first showcased in Indonesia at the 29th Gaikindo Indonesia International Auto Show, and launched to the market on 10 November 2022. It is imported from Japan. It was one of the official VIP vehicles used at the 2022 G20 Bali summit.

The bZ4X was launched in Thailand on 9 November 2022. As with Indonesia, it is also imported from Japan.

Subaru Solterra 

Featuring a minor exterior redesign, it uses the same e-TNGA platform rebranded to "e-Subaru Global Platform" (e-SGP). The Solterra went on sale in mid-2022 in Japan, US, Canada, Europe, and China.

In Japan, the Solterra is offered in ET-SS (FWD and AWD) and ET-HS (AWD only) grade levels. It is equipped with an active safety system marketed as "Subaru Safety Sense" as standard. Unlike the bZ4X in Japan, the Solterra is available for purchase.

Safety 
On 23 June 2022, Toyota and Subaru recalled 2,700 bZ4Xs and 2,600 Solterras due to the possibility that wheels could come loose. They also halted production and sales of any new models.

In 6 October 2022, Toyota reported it has found a fix to the loose wheel recall and has resumed production of the bZ4X and Solterra.

The bZ4X and Solterra achieved a five star JNCAP rating from Japan's National Agency for Automotive Safety and Victim's Aid (NASVA) for comprehensive safety performance, based on testing conducted on a Subaru Solterra.

The bZ4X and the Solterra also achieved a five-star 2022 Euro NCAP rating.

Sales

References

External links 

  (bZ4X, US)
  (Solterra, US)
 Official press release (bZ4X)
 Official press release (Solterra)

bZ4X
Cars introduced in 2021
Compact sport utility vehicles
Crossover sport utility vehicles
Production electric cars
Front-wheel-drive vehicles
All-wheel-drive vehicles
Electric concept cars
Euro NCAP small off-road